Griffith Quarry, a registered California Historical Landmark listed on the National Register of Historic Places, was a former granite quarry near Penryn, California.

History
The quarry was established by Griffith Griffith, a native of Wales, in 1864. The quarry produced high-quality granite used to construct many buildings in San Francisco and Sacramento, including parts of the California State Capitol. The  that surround the 2-story building, made of granite blocks, are the remains of the quarry and its polishing mill. This mill was the first successful granite polishing mill in California.

The office of Penryn Granite Works, which ran the quarry, is now the Griffith Quarry Museum that contains history about the site as well as other local history. Some of the original furniture of the Griffith Quarry is intact.

Recreation
Dirt walking trails can be found throughout the 23-acre park. These trails take visitors through the ruins of the polishing mill and some of the quarry holes from which granite was taken. Printed trail guides are available in the museum.

See also
California Historical Landmarks in Placer County, California
National Register of Historic Places listings in Placer County, California

References

External links
 Official Griffith Quarry Museum website
 Penryn Granite Quarry — walks through Griffith Quarry — a collection of photos of the quarry.

Mines in California
Museums in Placer County, California
Mining museums in California
California Historical Landmarks
Industrial buildings and structures on the National Register of Historic Places in California
Granite quarries
National Register of Historic Places in Placer County, California